Ludwig V may refer to:

 Louis V, Duke of Bavaria (1315–1361)
 Louis V, Elector Palatine (1478–1544)
 Louis V, Landgrave of Hesse-Darmstadt, Landgrave of Hesse-Darmstadt from 1596 to 1626